John Thomas Terrell (June 29, 1867 – July 9, 1893) was a professional baseball player who played catcher and left fielder. Terrell played one season in pro-baseball and spent part of that season in Major League Baseball.

Professional career
In 1886, Terrell played for the Macon, Georgia baseball club, and the Louisville Colonels. With the Macon club, Terrell played in 12 games, 5 at the catcher position, and 9 in the outfield. On the offensive side, Terrell batted .237 with 9 hits, and 1 double in 12 games. With the major league Colonels, Terrell played 1 games, and in 4 at-bats he attained 1 hit. He played at both the catcher, and outfield position in that game.

Death
Terrell died on July 9, 1893 in Louisville, Kentucky, also the place of his birth. He was buried in Saint John Cemetery in Louisville.

References

External links

1867 births
1893 deaths
Major League Baseball catchers
Major League Baseball left fielders
Baseball players from Louisville, Kentucky
Louisville Colonels players
19th-century baseball players
Macon (minor league baseball) players